Belle Island is an island of the Andaman Islands. It belongs to the North and Middle Andaman administrative district, part of the Indian union territory of Andaman and Nicobar Islands.

Geography
The island belongs to the West Baratang Group and is situated no more than 400 meters west of Baratang Island. It is, along neighbouring Baratang Islands, part of Rangat Taluk.

References

 Geological Survey of India
 

Islands of North and Middle Andaman district
Uninhabited islands of India
Islands of India
Islands of the Bay of Bengal